Lysander Farrar (May 2, 1812 Watertown, Jefferson County, New York – December 25, 1876) was an American lawyer and politician from New York.

Life
He was the son of Josiah Farrar (c.1772–1824). He graduated M.A. from Union College in 1836, and became Principal of the Jamestown Academy. On August 8, 1839, he married Melissa Malvina Keyes (1820–1892), and they had five children.

Then he studied law, was admitted to the bar, and practiced in Rochester. He was a member of the New York State Senate (28th D.) in 1862 and 1863.

Sources
 The New York Civil List compiled by Franklin Benjamin Hough, Stephen C. Hutchins and Edgar Albert Werner (1870; pg. 443)
 Biographical Sketches of the State Officers and the Members of the Legislature of the State of New York in 1862 and '63 by William D. Murphy (1863; pg. 64ff)
 The New York Annual Register (1836; pg. 248)
 A General Catalogue of the Officers, Graduates and Students of Union College from 1795 to 1854 (pg. 55)

1812 births
1876 deaths
Republican Party New York (state) state senators
Politicians from Watertown, New York
Politicians from Rochester, New York
Union College (New York) alumni
19th-century American politicians
Lawyers from Rochester, New York
19th-century American lawyers